Dortmunder Export or Dortmunder is a pale lager originally brewed by Dortmunder Union in Dortmund, Germany, in 1873. It is a soft-textured beer influenced by the Pilsner lager brewed in Pilsen.

History
After World War II, Export was the most popular type of beer in Germany until 1970, when it was supplanted by Pils. Its fortunes have revived a little since its low point of the late 1990s. In 2008, just under 10% of the beer sold in German shops was Export.

Dortmund style beers

Fred Eckhardt in A Treatise on Lager Beers, published in 1969, set out the view that Dortmunder is a distinctive enough pale lager to be classed as a separate beer style. 

Michael Jackson and Roger Protz continued the trend, although with a certain faint heart, uneasy at pinning down exactly the distinctive nature of the beer. 

Brewers outside of Germany who brew beers they term Dortmunder will tend to brew a pale lager with a soft, rounded character.

See also
Dortmunder Actien Brauerei
German beer
Pale lager

References

Further reading
Michael Jackson, The World Guide to Beer, 1977, pp68–69, Ballantine Books, 
Roger Protz, The Taste of Beer, Weidenfeld & Nicolson, 1998, pp200–202, 

Dortmund
Beer brands of Germany
German beer styles
Westphalia culture

de:Export (Bier)#Dortmunder Export